Murat Suyumagambetov (born 14 October 1983 in Aktau) is a Kazakhstani football forward who last played for FC Kyran. He also plays for the Kazakhstan national football team.

Career statistics

International goals

References

1983 births
Living people
Association football midfielders
Kazakhstani footballers
Kazakhstan international footballers
Kazakhstan Premier League players
FC Zhenis Astana players
FC Shakhter Karagandy players
FC Tobol players
FC Caspiy players
FC Zhetysu players
FC Ordabasy players
FC Kairat players
FC Vostok players
FC Taraz players
People from Aktau